The tesla (symbol: T) is the unit of magnetic flux density (also called magnetic B-field strength) in the International System of Units (SI). 

One tesla is equal to one weber per square metre. The unit was announced during the General Conference on Weights and Measures in 1960 and is named in honour of Serbian-American electrical and mechanical engineer Nikola Tesla, upon the proposal of the Slovenian electrical engineer France Avčin.

Definition 
A particle, carrying a charge of one coulomb (C), and moving perpendicularly through a magnetic field of one tesla, at a speed of one metre per second (m/s), experiences a force with magnitude one newton (N), according to the Lorentz force law.  That is, 

As an SI derived unit, the tesla can also be expressed in terms of other units.  For example, a magnetic flux of 1 weber (Wb) through a surface of one square meter is equal to a magnetic flux density of 1 tesla.  That is,

Expressed only in SI base units, 1 tesla is:

where A = ampere, kg = kilogram, and s = second.

Additional equivalences result from the derivation of coulombs from amperes (A), :

the relationship between newtons and joules (J), :

and the derivation of the weber from volts (V), :

Electric vs. magnetic field 

In the production of the Lorentz force, the difference between electric fields and magnetic fields is that a force from a magnetic field on a charged particle is generally due to the charged particle's movement, while the force imparted by an electric field on a charged particle is not due to the charged particle's movement. This may be appreciated by looking at the units for each. The unit of electric field in the MKS system of units is newtons per coulomb, N/C, while the magnetic field (in teslas) can be written as N/(C⋅m/s). The dividing factor between the two types of field is metres per second (m/s), which is velocity. This relationship immediately highlights the fact that whether a static electromagnetic field is seen as purely magnetic, or purely electric, or some combination of these, is dependent upon one's reference frame (that is, one's velocity relative to the field).

In ferromagnets, the movement creating the magnetic field is the electron spin (and to a lesser extent electron orbital angular momentum). In a current-carrying wire (electromagnets) the movement is due to electrons moving through the wire (whether the wire is straight or circular).

Conversion to non-SI units 
One tesla is equivalent to:
 10,000 (or 104) G (gauss), used in the CGS system. Thus, 1 G = 10−4 T = 100 μT (microtesla).
 1,000,000,000 (or 109) γ (gamma), used in geophysics. Thus, 1 γ = 1 nT (nanotesla).

For the relation to the units of the magnetising field (ampere per metre or Oersted), see the article on permeability.

Examples 

The following examples are listed in the ascending order of the magnetic-field strength.
 3.2 × 10−5 T (31.869 μT) – strength of Earth's magnetic field at 0° latitude, 0° longitude
 4 × 10−5 T (40 μT) – walking under a high-voltage power line
 5 × 10−3 T (5 mT) – the strength of a typical refrigerator magnet
 0.3 T – the strength of solar sunspots
 1.25 T – magnetic flux density at the surface of a neodymium magnet
 1 T to 2.4 T – coil gap of a typical loudspeaker magnet
 1.5 T to 3 T – strength of medical magnetic resonance imaging systems in practice, experimentally up to 17 T
 4 T – strength of the superconducting magnet built around the CMS detector at CERN
 5.16 T – the strength of a specially designed room temperature Halbach array
 8 T – the strength of LHC magnets
 11.75 T – the strength of INUMAC magnets, largest MRI scanner
 13 T – strength of the superconducting ITER magnet system
 14.5 T – highest magnetic field strength ever recorded for an accelerator steering magnet at Fermilab
 16 T – magnetic field strength required to levitate a frog (by diamagnetic levitation of the water in its body tissues) according to the 2000 Ig Nobel Prize in Physics
 17.6 T – strongest field trapped in a superconductor in a lab as of July 2014
 27 T – maximal field strengths of superconducting electromagnets at cryogenic temperatures
 35.4 T – the current (2009) world record for a superconducting electromagnet in a background magnetic field
 45 T – the current (2015) world record for continuous field magnets
 97.4 T – strongest magnetic field produced by a "non-destructive" magnet 
 100 T – approximate magnetic field strength of a typical white dwarf star
 1200 T – the field, lasting for about 100 microseconds, formed using the electromagnetic flux-compression technique
 109 T – Schwinger limit above which the electromagnetic field itself is expected to become nonlinear
 108 – 1011 T (100 MT – 100 GT) – magnetic strength range of magnetar neutron stars

Notes and references

External links 

 Gauss ↔ Tesla Conversion Tool

SI derived units
Units of magnetic flux density
1960 introductions
Nikola Tesla